Cassius Khan (born 7 June 1974), is a Canadian Indian classical musician known for playing the Tabla while singing.

Early years 
Khan was born in Lautoka, Fiji in 1974.

As a young teenager in Vancouver, Canada, Khan met Mushtari Begum, a Ghazal singer, Sheikh Mohyudean, a harmonium and Qawaali singer, and Ustad Rukhsar Ali, a Tabla player. He learned to sing Ghazal and play the Tabla simultaneously. Khan's repertoire also includes the Tarannum Ang Gayaki while playing the Tabla, and this became his trademark style. As a key figure in this rare style of performance, he was named "Ustad" or Maestro in 2016 by Pt Salil Bhatt during the 5th Annual Mushtari Begum Festival of Indian Classical Music and Dance in New Westminster, British Columbia.

Khan's early career met with limited success after the recording and international tour of his first album, Cassius Khan-The Young Tabla/Ghazal Wizard. After completing his education at college and university, he embarked on his music career, starting by touring the folk festival scene in North America, South Pacific, Europe and South America, performing solo and in collaboration with other artists as both a Tabla player and vocalist.

Career 
After performing as a sideman in various bands, in 2001, Khan composed the "Asia Music" for the IAAF World Championships in Athletics under the guidance of composer Jan Randall. The same year, he was included in BBC Radio 2's list of the "Top 25 World Artists to look out for".
 
In 2005, Khan performed Ghazal and a Tabla solo recital at the National Arts Centre in Ottawa as part of Alberta Scene Festival, and presented his first classical Ghazal and Tabla recital at a Canadian folk festival at the Salmon Arm Roots and Blues Festival in 2006. He was selected out of 8,000 applicants to showcase Ghazal/Tabla at South by Southwest in Austin, Texas in 2008. That same year Ellen McIlwaine and Khan were invited to perform for Juno Fest, as they were shortlisted for the 2008 Juno Awards for Roots & Traditional Album of the Year, and subsequently performed together at the Juno Awards in Calgary. The following year Khan was a featured artist for the Canadian Music Week. Khan's recordings were also selected for the Japan Trade Mission in 2009. Khan was also the first Canadian to perform at the Sa Ma Pa Music Festival in New Delhi, on 23 November 2013.
  
Khan was signed by the Yarlowe Artist Group in 2008. He fired his management in 2009 and hired Reboot Management in 2016, before terminating their service four months later.

Khan's Ghazal album Mushtari, a live concert, released in 2011, was nominated for "World Album of the Year" by the Western Canadian Music Awards (WCMA) and was a tribute to Khan's guru and teacher, Mushtari Begum, with a selection of classical Ghazals and a tabla solo recital. This was the first album ever recorded with Ghazal and tabla simultaneously by one artist. He also released a tabla solo single, "Sparks of Energy", in 2011. Both of these albums feature Khan's wife Amika Kushwaha as the Harmonium soloist.

Khan's other collaborations include: Dark Clouds (2006) with Jazz pianist Stu Goldberg of Mahavishnu Orchestra; a collaboration with slide guitarist Ellen McIlwaine entitled Mystic Bridge, a Blues/Indian music album which was shortlisted for the Juno Award for Roots & Traditional Album of the Year in 2008; I Feel Love Again (2002) with Mediterranean guitarist Pavlo; Mani Licks (2002) with Heavy Metal/shred guitarist Dan Mani; A Demon's Dream (2002) and The Alchemists (2002) with acoustic/electric guitarist Dave Martone; and Angel of Sevilla (1990) with the Spanish guitarist D'Arcy Greaves.

Khan has also collaborated with the inventor of the Mohan Veena, artist Pandit Vishwa Mohan Bhatt, Satvik Veena performer Pandit Salil Bhatt, Kathak artist/Harmonium soloist and many other figures of Indian classical music and Ghazal singers. Khan has also worked in television and is featured in a commercial for Nanak Foods as a tabla player who finds musical inspiration after being served the halwa sweet dish by his wife, Amika Kushwaha.

Recognition 
Khan was awarded the "Salute to Excellence Award" in 2005 by the City of Edmonton for his contribution to Indian classical music, and the "Bernie Legge Artist of the Year" by the City of New Westminster Chamber of Commerce in 2019. He was nominated (with Ellen McIlwaine) for a Juno Award for their album Mystic Bridge in 2008, and a WCMA Award nomination for his album Mushtari-a live concert. He has also performed in Geneva, Switzerland, for the United Nations, World Intellectual Property Organization and the Permanent Mission of India for Namaste Geneva, an initiative created by the Indian Ambassador to the UN, Rajiv Chander, in 2017/2018.

With his wife, Amika Kushwaha, Khan founded the Mushtari Begum Festival of Indian Classical Music and Dance, which took place for the first time on 25 August 2012 at the Massey Theatre in New Westminster, British Columbia.He is an honorary Cultural Ambassador to the City of New Westminster. He hosted a radio show entitled "The Cassius Khan Show: Connecting Classical Music to Your Hearts".

Khan is also the official spokesperson for the tabla makers Ustad Qasim Khan Niyazi and Sons in Laxminagar, New Delhi, India, and is endorsed by Aman Kalyan's Lehra Studio apps based in Sydney, Australia. He is also the Curator of the Massey Unlimited Global Tea Series at the Massey Theatre in New Westminster, and was a 2021 Artist Resident at the Anvil Centre in the same city. Khan is also a visiting music instructor at the international private Mulgrave School, where he teaches young students Indian Classical music.

Personal life

Khan lives in New Westminster, British Columbia. He married Kathak dancer Amika Kushwaha in 2006, and they are each other's chief accompanists in her solo Kathak dance concerts and his Ghazal and tabla concerts.

Khan refused to perform in Israel in 2009 in protest at the treatment of Palestinians. He has been critical of the term World Music, and the lack of representation of non-Western disciplines in the Canadian music scene.

References

External links
Fijitimes.com
Eyeweekly.com
Mehfilmagaine.com
Cassius Khan website

1974 births
Living people
Fijian Muslims
Male ghazal singers
People from Lautoka
Fijian emigrants to Canada
Tabla players
Canadian people of Fijian descent
Fijian musicians
21st-century drummers
21st-century Canadian male singers